The following highways are numbered 55:

International
 European route E55
 Arab Mashreq route M55

Argentina
 San Luis Provincial Route 55

Australia
 Carnarvon Highway
  Castlereagh Highway
 Karoonda Highway

Belgium
 N55 road (Belgium)

Canada
 Alberta Highway 55
 Saskatchewan Highway 55
 Quebec Autoroute 55

China 
  G55 Expressway

Croatia
 D55 road (Croatia)

Czech Republic
 R55 expressway (Czech Republic)

Finland
 Finnish national road 55

France
 A55 autoroute
 N55 road (France)

Germany
 Bundesstraße 55

India

Iran
Road 55

Ireland
 N55 road (Ireland)

Israel
 Highway 55 (Israel)

Italy
 Autostrada A55

Japan
 Japan National Route 55

Jordan

Pakistan
 National Highway 55

Korea, South
 Jungang Expressway
Gukjido 55

Philippines
 N55 highway (Philippines)

Russia
 Baikal Highway (Former Number, Now renamed R2580)

South Africa
 R55 route

United Kingdom
 British A55 (Holyhead-Chester)
 British M55 (Fulwood-Blackpool)
 A55 road (Northern Ireland)

United States
 Interstate 55
 U.S. Route 55 (former)
 U.S. Route 55 (Arizona-Wisconsin) (former proposal)
 Alabama State Route 55
 Arkansas Highway 55 (1926-1958) (former)
 California State Route 55
 Colorado State Highway 55
 Connecticut Route 55
 Florida State Road 55
 Georgia State Route 55
 Idaho State Highway 55
 Illinois Route 55 (former)
 Indiana State Road 55
 Iowa Highway 55 (former)
 K-55 (Kansas highway)
 Kentucky Route 55
 Louisiana Highway 55
 Louisiana State Route 55 (former)
 Maryland Route 55
 M-55 (Michigan highway)
 Minnesota State Highway 55
 County Road 55 (Chisago County, Minnesota)
Missouri Route 55 (1922) (former)
 Montana Highway 55
 Nebraska Highway 55 (former)
 Nebraska Link 55K
 Nebraska Link 55W
 Nebraska Link 55X
 Nebraska Spur 55B
 Nebraska Spur 55C
 Nebraska Spur 55D
 Nebraska Spur 55E
 Nebraska Spur 55F
 Nebraska Spur 55G
 Nebraska Spur 55H
 Nebraska Spur 55J
 Nebraska Spur 55M
 Nebraska Recreation Road 55N
 Nebraska Recreation Road 55P
 Nebraska Recreation Road 55R
 Nebraska Recreation Road 55T
 Nebraska Recreation Road 55U
 Nebraska Recreation Road 55V
 Nevada State Route 55 (former)
 New Jersey Route 55
 County Route 55 (Bergen County, New Jersey)
 County Route 55 (Monmouth County, New Jersey)
 New Mexico State Road 55
 New York State Route 55
 County Route 55 (Cattaraugus County, New York)
 County Route 55 (Chemung County, New York)
 County Route 55 (Dutchess County, New York)
 County Route 55 (Franklin County, New York)
 County Route 55 (Herkimer County, New York)
 County Route 55 (Lewis County, New York)
 County Route 55 (Madison County, New York)
 County Route 55 (Niagara County, New York)
 County Route 55 (Onondaga County, New York)
 County Route 55 (Orange County, New York)
 County Route 55 (Oswego County, New York)
 County Route 55 (Otsego County, New York)
 County Route 55 (Putnam County, New York)
 County Route 55 (Rensselaer County, New York)
 County Route 55 (Saratoga County, New York)
 County Route 55 (Schoharie County, New York)
 County Route 55 (St. Lawrence County, New York)
 County Route 55 (Steuben County, New York)
 County Route 55 (Suffolk County, New York)
 County Route 55 (Sullivan County, New York)
 County Route 55 (Warren County, New York)
 North Carolina Highway 55
 Ohio State Route 55
 Oklahoma State Highway 55
 Pennsylvania Route 55 (former)
 South Carolina Highway 55
 South Dakota Highway 55 (former)
 Tennessee State Route 55
 Texas State Highway 55
 Farm to Market Road 55 (Texas)
 Texas Park Road 55
 Utah State Route 55
 Virginia State Route 55
 West Virginia Route 55
 Wisconsin Highway 55

Vietnam
 National Road 55 (Vietnam)

See also 
 List of highways numbered 55A
 A55 roads
 National Maximum Speed Law, a United States law setting the speed limit at 
Hwy 55 Burgers, Shakes & Fries, a United States-based restaurant chain named after North Carolina Highway 55